Agriomelissa victrix is a moth of the family Sesiidae. It is known from Cameroon.

References

Endemic fauna of Cameroon
Sesiidae
Insects of Cameroon
Moths of Africa
Moths described in 1916